Ronald E. Shaw (1924 – April 4, 2001) was an American historian.

Life
He served in the Army from 1943 to 1946.  He graduated from the University of Rochester with a Ph.D.

He taught at Wayne State University, and Miami University from 1954 until 1993, the first W. E. Smith Professor of History.

Awards
 1965 Frederick Jackson Turner Award

Works
 Reprint of 1990 volume.
 Reprint of the original 1966 volume.

References

20th-century American historians
American male non-fiction writers
1924 births
2001 deaths
University of Rochester alumni
Wayne State University faculty
Miami University faculty
20th-century American male writers